The Stardom World Climax 2022 was a two-day professional wrestling event promoted by World Wonder Ring Stardom. The event took place on March 26 and 27, 2022, in Tokyo, Japan at the Ryōgoku Kokugikan, with a limited attendance due in part to the ongoing COVID-19 pandemic at the time.

Event

The show featured a total of seventeen professional wrestling matches (eight on the first night, nine on the second) that resulted from scripted storylines, where wrestlers portrayed villains, heroes, or less distinguishable characters in the scripted events that built tension and culminated in a wrestling match or series of matches. The press conference for the event was held on March 3, 2022 and was broadcast on Stardom's YouTube channel, announcing and officializing all of the matches from both nights. For the second night, various rookie talent from other promotions from the Japanese independent scene who also competed in the New Blood 1 event on March 11, were announced to be part of the Cinderella rumble such as Tomoka Inaba & Aoi from Professional Wrestling Just Tap Out's "queen division", Haruka Umesaki & Nanami from World Woman Pro-Wrestling Diana, Maria & Ai Houzan from Marvelous That's Women's Wrestling, and Mei Suruga & Yuna Mizumori from Gatoh Move Pro Wrestling's Choco Pro branch.

Storylines
On February 28, 2022, Kairi Hojo returned to Stardom after working in WWE from 2017 until 2021 as Kairi Sane. It was announced Hojo would participate in World Climax, now under the name Kairi in all caps. At the press conference, Kairi was confronted by Unagi Sayaka and Tam Nakano, with the former challenging her to a tag team match at the event with Kairi expressing interest in teaming with Mayu Iwatani against Sayaka & Nakano. As Kairi was leaving she was attacked viciously by Oedo Tai's Natsuko Tora, Starlight Kid & Momo Watanabe.

Matches

The first night of the show took place on March 26 under the tagline of "The Best", with the preshow fight between the retaining Future of Stardom Champion Hanan against Rina being broadcast live on Stardom's YouTube channel. The first show from the main card portraited the singles match between Saya Iida and Mirai, won by the latter as a result of a submission. The third match saw Donna Del Mondo's sub-unit of "Second MaiHimePoi" composed of Himeka, Natsupoi & Mai Sakurai (the first MaiHimePoi being composed of Maika instead of Sakurai) winning the six-woman tag team gauntlet match. Next, Prominence's Suzu Suzuki & Risa Sera picked up a victory against the SWA World Champion Thekla & Maika, and amplified the tensions between the independent stable and Donna Del Mondo. Next, Oedo Tai's sub-unit of Black Desire, composed of Starlight Kid & Momo Watanabe dethroned FWC (Hazuki & Koguma) to take the Goddess of Stardom Championship, first time for Kid, second for Watanabe as an individual. Next, the returning Kairi teamed up with Stars stable leader Mayu Iwatani to defeat Tam Nakano & Unagi Sayaka. In the seventh match of the night, Saya Kamitani successfully defended the Wonder of Stardom Championship against Queen's Quest stablemate Utami Hayashishita as a counterpart of their match from Stardom All Star Dream Cinderella on March 3, 2021 where Hayashishita successfully defended the World of Stardom Championship against Kamitani. The main event saw Syuri successfully defending the "red belt" against fellow stablemate Giulia. After she retained, Syuri said she wants to walk on her path and would tease the formation of a new stable, with a mysterious girl helping her out of the arena as the first announced member. The girl was later presented to be Ami Miura from Actwres girl'Z.

The second night of the event occurred on March 27 under the tag line of "The Top" and started with Hanan successfully defending the Future of Stardom Championship against Mai Sakurai. At the end of the match, a returning Hina came out to challenge her for the championship. The preshow, on the first day, was broadcast on Stardom's YouTube channel. After winning the 18-woman cinderella rumble, Mei Suruga issued a challenge for AZM's High Speed Championship. The third match saw Utami Hayashishita, who lost the Wonder of Stardom Championship confrontation against Saya Kamitani the previous night defeating Mirai by submission. The fourth match portrayed Momo Watanabe defeating Hazuki, pointing to their past match from Stardom Dream Queendom on December 29, 2021 against Mayu Iwatani & Takumi Iroha in which Watanabe dumped Hazuki by leaving the ring and attracted a loss. In the fifth match, AZM successfully defended the High Speed Championship for the first time in her second reign against Natsupoi and Koguma. Next, Kairi defeated Starlight Kid in a singles match. However, it was reported that Kairi suffered a legitimate ruptured eardrum. Next, Donna Del Mondo's Giulia, Himeka, Maika & Thekla succeeded in defeating Prominence's Risa Sera, Suzu Suzuki, Akane Fujita & Mochi Miyagi. Despite their loss, Suzu Suzuki stated that she was not finished with Giulia and that she will continue to chase the latter in various future confrontations until she succeeds in defeating the Donna Del Mondo leader. Next, Saya Kamitani defended the Wonder of Stardom successfully against Tam Nakano, making the second defense for Kamitani in less than twenty-four hours.

The main event portraited the confrontation between Syuri and Mayu Iwatani with the World of Stardom Championship at stake. Syuri succeeded in defending and as Saya Kamitani, scored a second defense in less than twenty-four hours.

Results

Notes

References

External links
Page Stardom World

2022 in professional wrestling
2022 in Tokyo
Women's professional wrestling shows
World Wonder Ring Stardom shows
World Wonder Ring Stardom
Professional wrestling in Tokyo